Dalimil Mikyska (born 16 August 1999) is a Czech professional ice hockey player. He is currently playing for HC Karlovy Vary in the Czech Extraliga (ELH) on loan from HC Kometa Brno.

Mikyska made his Czech Extraliga debut playing with HC Kometa Brno during the 2015–16 Czech Extraliga season.

Career statistics

Regular season and playoffs

International

References

External links

1999 births
Living people
Czech ice hockey defencemen
HC Karlovy Vary players
HC Kometa Brno players
People from Břeclav
SK Horácká Slavia Třebíč players
Sportspeople from the South Moravian Region